Michel Harvey (January 31, 1937 – 12 February 2017) was a Canadian professional ice hockey player and coach.

During the 1972–73 season, Harvey played 40 games in the World Hockey Association with the Quebec Nordiques.

References

External links

1938 births
2017 deaths
Canadian ice hockey centres
Chicoutimi Saguenéens (QSHL) players
Hershey Bears players
Ice hockey people from Quebec
Maine Nordiques players
North American Hockey League (1973–1977) coaches
People from Alma, Quebec
Quebec Aces (AHL) players
Quebec Nordiques (WHA) players
San Francisco Seals (ice hockey) players